Lady Mastermind is a fictional character and supervillain, appearing in American comic books published by Marvel Comics. Created by writer Chris Claremont and artist Salvador Larroca, the character first appeared as Regan Wyngarde in X-Treme X-Men #6 (December 2001).

Regan Wyngarde is the daughter of Jason Wyngarde, the original Mastermind. Her half-sisters are Martinique Jason, the second Mastermind, who now shares her codename, and the X-Men's Pixie. Like her sister and father, Regan possesses the ability to cast telepathic illusions. Although the character originally appeared as a villain, she would later have a brief stint as an X-Man, betraying the X-Men a short time after joining them.

Fictional character biography

X-Treme X-Men
Lady Mastermind is one of three daughters of Jason Wyngarde, the original Mastermind. She has an intense hatred for her half-sister, Martinique (though she was the first to use their now-shared codename). She is hated by her sister for "stealing the spotlight", while she hates her sister for being a "skank", with the two of them constantly insulting each other.

She was originally involved in a plot created by Sebastian Shaw to have his revenge against Sage and gain control of the Sydney underworld. This plot was created by using Regan's telepathic illusionary powers to assassinate Miles Warbeck, an Australian underworld crime lord known as Viceroy, and framing Gambit over his death.

In an attempt to make Sage work for Shaw again, Lady Mastermind placed her in a series of illusions. However, with the assistance of Lifeguard, the daughter of Viceroy, Sage was able to break the illusion and reflect Regan's powers back against her, leaving her in a vegetative state.

Joining The X-Men
Regan is one of few mutants that retained their superhuman powers after M-Day. Cannonball and Iceman find a comatose Regan, along with a partially disassembled Karima Shapandar. It was stated that Regan fell victim to scientists of the Fordyce Clinic who were trying to determine if a person can catch mutation like a disease. 

Regan finally awakened from her coma after her powers had been temporarily hijacked by Serafina. She joins Rogue's strike force/field team, but Rogue told Regan that she is only wearing the X-Men uniform because she was found with nothing more than a white sheet. Soon afterwards, the team was ambushed by Pandemic's forces, which captured Rogue and teleported to an unknown location. Eventually, Karima Shapandar was able to restart the teleportation device, but things did not go exactly as planned. Regan was teleported up high into the air and fell from an enormous height. Luckily, Iceman managed to catch her before she hit the ground. Mystique, who was also teleported by the machine, was not as lucky as she was, and vanished. Regan and Iceman soon regrouped with Karima Shapandar, and the trio began to search for Pandemic. They find Pandemic and defeat him but Rogue is infected with Strain 88 in the process. The team goes to Cable's island utopia of Providence to find a cure for Rogue. While there the island is attacked by an ancient Shi'ar superweapon known as the Hecatomb, forcing Regan and the rest of the team to fight the psionic horror. The weapon is eventually defeated thanks to Rogue's power-absorption abilities, now supercharged due to Strain 88.

Marauders
When Rogue's team of X-Men goes to one of Mystique's safe-houses an intruder alarm later goes off. Initially confused by the seemingly invisible nature of their opponents, the X-Men are caught off guard when Regan drops her illusionary cloak to reveal the Marauders. Regan later fights alongside the other Marauders in Flint, Michigan, against Iceman and Cannonball, as both sides try to obtain the Diaries of Destiny.

Messiah Complex
Along with fellow Marauders Sunfire, Gambit, Prism, Blockbuster, Malice, and Scalphunter, Regan travels to Cooperstown, Alaska to find the baby but instead come across the Purifiers and they come to blows. The next time Regan is seen is when the X-Men send a strike force to confront the Marauders. Working with Malice, she disguises an unconscious Scrambler as Angel and Malice drops him on Wolverine cancelling out his healing factor. Malice says this illusion is courtesy of Regan and boasts how she is a retired X-Man. Nightcrawler teleports in and kicks her in the head knocking her out. When the X-Men, X-Factor, and X-Force arrive on Muir Island, Lady Mastermind attempts to cast an illusion to hide the Marauders. However, Wolverine picks up her scent and stabs her in the abdomen.

Sisterhood of Mutants
The Sisterhood approaches Regan, who is at a graveyard mourning her father. At first, Regan points her gun to Madelyne Pryor's head. When Madelyne promises to resurrect Regan's father, Regan joins - this, however, disgusts Martinique. Later in San Francisco, the Sisterhood perform a spell involving Kwannon's body and a captive Psylocke, restoring her to her original body. Later, when the Sisterhood attack the X-Men, Regan takes out Emma Frost by trapping her in an illusion and then leaving her bound and gagged in a dark room, cutting her off from her senses. While trapped, Emma unexpectedly finds what seems to be Jean Grey communicating to her, and seemingly aiding Emma. Emma becomes the first person not to fall for Regan's illusion, prompting Regan to worry. Emma then savagely beats Regan, calling her a traitor to her kind. Emma leaves Regan's bruised and battered body upon the ground, though the Sisterhood later pick her up and escape.

When they return to base, the Red Queen orders Regan, Martinique, and Psylocke to stay while she and the other members of the Sisterhood go to Jean Grey's grave. They take on Storm, Dazzler, Karma and Emma Frost, who savagely beats her again. After the Red Queen's defeat, Spiral collects the Sisterhood and teleports off.

Pixie Strikes Back
In the second issue of X-Men: Pixie Strikes Back, the mother of X-Man Pixie, Mrs. Gwynn, teleports herself to the Wyngarde Mansion, where Regan is fighting with Martinique and reveals Pixie is their half-sister. Teaming up with Mrs. Gwynn who offers the sisters power in exchange for their help, they attempt to track down Pixie after being kidnapped by Saturnine. During the final confrontation with the demon, Pixie teleports both Regan and Martinique away when X-23 attempts to attack them.

All-New X-Men 
Sometime later, Regan ends up incarcerated in The Raft. Together with Sabretooth, Mystique breaks Regan out of jail and offers her a chance to get rich as well as informing Regan of Charles Xavier's death. Regan agrees to join them and after being held up by S.H.I.E.L.D. soldiers, Regan casts an illusion to make it seem the soldiers are being attacked by zombie Avengers so the trio can make their escape.

Regan is shock to see a live, although time displaced, Jean Grey back in the present. She uses this opportunity to create an illusion of her father from his time with the Inner Circle, when he tried to seduce the Dark Phoenix, causing what seemed to be the rebirth, or arrival, of the Phoenix Force once more. However, it was later revealed to be a telepathic illusion created by the time displaced Jean Grey, much to Regan's disappointment. She later boasts to the young Jean that she knows her more than Jean knows her and projects an illusion of Scott making out with Emma. Out of anger, Jean tells her that she projects very convincing illusions, but the difference between Jean's illusions and Regan's was that Jean projected reality, delving into Regan's mind and making her see her darkest fears, which was an image of a sad young woman sitting in a wheelchair. Regan manages to temporarily escape the team by projecting an illusion of the Avengers who had come to take the time displaced original X-Men. She, however, is thwarted from her attempted escape when Shadowcat phased through the aircraft, causing it to malfunction. Regan is knocked unconscious with one punch from Kitty. Whilst Mystique was put in prison, it would seem Regan gave the authorities the slip once more, as she was soon seen causing trouble again.

Despite Regan’s apathetic attitude, at times she clearly wanted to become better at using her powers and strived to push herself to create even more realistic illusions. She just needed practice. To that end, when she saw Anole, one of the X-Men’s students, she realized she had found the perfect guinea-pig. Anole had skipped out on a first date with a guy because he was afraid that his reptilian appearance would scare him off. Regan latched onto this insecurity and trapped Anole in an illusion that preyed on his fears of rejection. She was having a wonderful time watching the boy succumb to his fears and it got better when a couple of X-Men turned up to help. She immediately trapped them in their own fear-based illusions and the trick worked, for a while at least. As he had faced his fears numerous times, Nightcrawler broke out of Regan’s illusion and forced Anole to do the same. Regan’s over-confidence worked against her once more when she allowed herself to get too close to the X-Men and she was knocked unconscious.

All-New, Different Marvel
Following the rebirth of the Marvel Universe, Regan is revealed to be one of the many mutants poisoned by the Terrigen Cloud roaming the Earth's atmosphere. Suffering from the M-Pox and fearing to die alone, she trapped as many people as she could in illusions and planned to take them with her. Regan was, however, found by Dani Moonstar, who tried to reason with her to release the people she put under and let the X-Men help her. At first, Regan refuses and tries to trap Moonstar in an illusion;  as Moonstar resisted her illusion, Regan begs her to stop fighting, stating  if she is going to die she won't die alone.  Persistent, Moonstar tells her that she understand her fear and pain more than she knows, but Regan finds it hard to believe, saying to her that she has no idea what it's like to live with fear. To show how much she understood, Moonstar shows Regan her memories and all the pain she went through, cancelling her illusion in the process. As the M-Pox began killing Regan, she begs Moonstar end her suffering by killing her, unwilling to live with the pain; Moonstar convinces her not to give up and maintain her courage, no matter what happens. Moonstar transports Regan to X-Haven, where the healers managed to stabilize her condition. As Moonstar leaves her to get healed, Regan thanks her for making her see the error of ways.

Rejoining the X-Men
After her recovery, Lady Mastermind was eventually welcomed to the new mutant island of Krakoa, created by Xavier, Magneto and Moira. She entered through the teleportation gateway alongside other villainous and fractious mutants, who had been invited to join the nation in order to heal mutantdom and start over as a whole species together. However she apparently left Krakoa for her own reasons and went to the now abandoned X-Mansion in order to use one of its teleport gates to rejoin the X-Men on Krakoa. There, she is attacked and captured by a horde of Sidri hatchlings after accidentally disturbing their nest. She instinctively uses her powers to exert some control over them, causing Krakoa to alert the X-Men to investigate. After Cypher, a member of the scouting party, manages to establish a rapport with the Sidri, Regan is liberated and taken back to Krakoa.

During the "Empyre" storyline, Lady Mastermind is among the psychic mutants that are summoned to Genosha. She is among those who witness Magik's fight with the Cotatinaught.

Characteristics

Powers and abilities

Lady Mastermind possesses the mutant power to project extremely convincing and realistic illusions into the minds of others, the same ability her father had.

Her illusions are telepathic and her victims tend to accept them as fact, even when the images and scenarios they are confronted with involve sudden changes to the world around them, or are inconsistent or improbable (for example, Rogue, when under Lady Mastermind's control, did not question the sudden existence of a multitude of Vargases, or the random jumps in location and time she was experiencing). As such, they can be used as a very effective brainwashing tool.

Regan's powers have psychosomatic effects, meaning they can also kill, as her victims' bodies respond as if her illusions are real. She confronted Viceroy with the illusion that he was drowning, and, believing it to be real, he suffocated, despite having no physical injuries and being in a room with sufficient oxygen. Heather Cameron's body also responded in a similar way, bleeding through the pores in her back when she was under the illusion she had been stabbed.

Also, her illusions can put enemies in a coma-like state, by telepathically trapping her enemies' minds in a maze from which there's no escape. This technique, when combined with a psychic chaff that Regan is also capable of emitting, is an effective tool against even the most powerful of telepaths: as Regan was able to imprison a sleeping Emma Frost's mind using such a method. The White Queen found that her cognition was too interrupted to even understand what was happening, much less summon her own psionic abilities to fight back. Emma was freed, however, by the appearance of Jean Grey, who broke the psi-chaff, utilizing her emblematic Phoenix raptor.

In addition, unlike her father, both Regan and her half-sister Martinique have limited telepathic abilities that enable them to read their opponent's mind and make their illusions all the more accurate for it. Regan's illusions have also been shown to persist even after she has been rendered unconscious.

Personality
Lady Mastermind has a distinct personality, to a point where writer Mike Carey refers to her as an "exuberant, sexy sociopath". Regan's brief tenure as an X-Man has granted her the X-Men uniform, something she still wears proudly even after attacking several of the X-Men. Interviewer Trevor Cates asked Carey why he added Lady Mastermind to the X-Men; Carey's response was:
"So I chose Lady Mastermind partly because she's such a volatile and extreme personality. As with Mystique, you suspect that some aspects of her behavior may have their roots in an actual psychosis. But on the surface you've just got this amazing, wickedly ingenious, endlessly aggressive woman who never lets anyone get away with anything. She's the hardest X-Man for Rogue to wrangle, even taking Mystique into account. Because of course Mystique is trying hard – for whatever reasons – to be supportive of Rogue's position, while Regan doesn't give a damn."

Reception

Accolades 

 In 2014, Entertainment Weekly ranked Lady Mastermind 74th in their "Let's rank every X-Man ever" list.
 In 2019, CBR.com ranked Lady Mastermind 8th in their "X-Men: The 10 Most Powerful Female Villains" list and 8th in their "10 Daughters Of Marvel Supervillains That Are More Dangerous Than Their Parents" list.
 In 2020, CBR.com ranked Lady Mastermind 10th in their "X-Men: 10 Most Powerful Members of the Sisterhood of Mutants" list.
 In 2020, Scary Mommy included Lady Mastermind in their "Looking For A Role Model? These 195+ Marvel Female Characters Are Truly Heroic" list.
 In 2022, CBR.com ranked Lady Mastermind 10th in their "10 Best Marvel Legacy Villains" list.

Other versions

Age of X
In the Age of X reality, Regan is present when Magneto creates Fortress X.

X-Men: The End
In the future depicted in X-Men: The End, both Martinique and Regan fell prey to Mister Sinister and he turned them to stone. Using their bodies, he created a device that would ensnare people in an illusion should they get too close. When the X-Men came to attack Sinister, the Ladies Mastermind caught them in an illusion that played out their heart’s desire. Thanks to a telepathic nudge from Jean Grey, Wolverine broke free of the illusion and destroyed the statues, ending Regan’s torture.

References

External links
MarvelDatabase:Lady Mastermind
MarvelDatabase:Character Gallery Lady Mastermind
Lady Mastermind on the Marvel Universe Character Bio Wiki

Characters created by Chris Claremont
Characters created by Salvador Larroca
Comics characters introduced in 2001
Fictional illusionists
Fictional murderers
Marvel Comics female superheroes
Marvel Comics female supervillains
Marvel Comics mutants
Marvel Comics characters who have mental powers
Marvel Comics telepaths